Julie Bell (born October 21, 1958) is an American fine artist, illustrator, photographer, bodybuilder and wildlife painter. Bell is also a fantasy artist and a representative of the heroic fantasy and fantastic realism genres. Bell has won Chesley Awards and was the designer of the Dragons of Destiny series. She also won first place awards in the Art Renewal Center's International Salon and was named as a Living Master.

Early life 
Julie Bell was born on October 21, 1958 in Beaumont, Texas. She attended six schools studying painting and drawing. In her youth, she was fond of bodybuilding. She took part in various competitions and received national recognition, which later influenced her to portray beautiful and muscular women.

In 1978, Bell married scientist and writer Donald E. Palumbo. During this marriage, she gave birth to two sons, Anthony and David Palumbo, who subsequently also became professional artists. In 1989, she met Boris Vallejo, whom later she married.

Career
Bell also turned her attention to painting wildlife. In the 2014 Art Renewal Center's International Salon, she won seven awards and two purchase awards, including 1st and 3rd in the Animal Category and 1st place in the Imaginative Realism Category. In November 2015, she was awarded the Mountain Oyster Club's Denise McCalla Memorial Top Choice Award. She was named a Living Master by the Art Renewal Center.

When I'm painting animals with all their beauty and wild nature, I experience the kind of at-one-with-the-universe feeling described by people who meditate.  It's both soothing and exciting, the way nature itself is.  I know without a doubt that this is what I was meant to do.

Bell shares her studio in Pennsylvania with her husband, Boris Vallejo.

Bell has painted the cover illustrations of more than 100 fantasy and science fiction books and magazines since 1990, including more than 90 in the 20 years to 2009. In the early 1990s, she illustrated painted covers for video games as well as best-selling trading cards for the superheroes of Marvel and DC. A cover art image from the Sega Game Gear video game Ax Battler: A Legend of Golden Axe would depict the semi-barbaric world that the game took place in; thus being entitled Savage Land by Bell herself. She designed the Dragons of Destiny sculpture series, Mistress of the Dragon's Realm dagger series, as well as the Temptation Rides sculpture series produced by The Franklin Mint.

She designed the cover art for Meat Loaf's albums Bat Out of Hell III: The Monster Is Loose and its first single "It's All Coming Back to Me Now", the album Hang Cool Teddy Bear, and the album "Crossroads".

In 2007, Bell and Vallejo illustrated the poster for Aqua Teen Hunger Force Colon Movie Film for Theaters.

Honors
 Art Renewal Center, multiple 1st place awards & honorable mentions.

Books
 The Julie Bell Portfolio (1994)
 Hard Curves: The Fantasy Art of Julie Bell (1995), with Hank Rose and Nigel Suckling
 Soft As Steel: The Art of Julie Bell (1999), with Brian Aldiss and Suckling
 Titans: The Heroic Visions of Boris Vallejo and Julie Bell (2000), with Suckling, Bell, and Vallejo; also issued 2000 with main title Superheroes
 Sketchbook (2001), with Suckling, Bell, and Vallejo
 Twin Visions (2002), with Bell and Vallejo
 Fantasy Workshop: A Practical Guide: The Painting Techniques of Boris Vallejo and Julie Bell (2003), with Bell and Vallejo
 Boris Vallejo/Julie Bell: The Ultimate Collection (2005), with Suckling, Bell, and Vallejo
 The Fantasy of Flowers (2006), with Bell and Vallejo
 The Fabulous Women of Boris Vallejo and Julie Bell (2006), with David Palumbo, Anthony Palumbo, Bell, and Vallejo
 Imaginistix: The Art of Boris Vallejo and Julie Bell (2007), with Palumbo, Palumbo, Bell, and Vallejo
 Boris Vallejo and Julie Bell: The Ultimate illustrations (2009), with Bell and Vallejo
 Dreamland: The Fantastic Worlds of Boris Vallejo and Julie Bell (2014), with Bell and Vallejo

References

External links
 
 BorisJulie.com
 rehscgi.com (biography)

1958 births
Living people
American women painters
American artists' models
American speculative fiction artists
Fantasy artists
American female bodybuilders
People from Beaumont, Texas
Pin-up artists
Painters from Texas
American women illustrators
American illustrators
20th-century American painters
21st-century American painters
20th-century American women artists
21st-century American women artists